The Wellington and Severn Junction Railway was a railway in Shropshire, England. It was built between 1857 - 1861 and formed part of the Wellington to Craven Arms Railway. For much of its working life, it was operated by the Great Western Railway and subsequently the Western Region of British Railways.

Stations
Its route included the following stations: -

References

Early British railway companies
Railway lines opened in 1861
Closed railway lines in the West Midlands (region)
Ironbridge Gorge
1861 establishments in England
British companies established in 1861